Threads is the second studio album by the indie rock band Now, Now, formerly known as Now, Now Every Children. It was released in 2012 on Trans Records. It is the first album under the band's new name. It was also the first full album by the band to feature new guitarist and background vocalist Jess Abbott. It was recorded in Vancouver, British Columbia in 2011.

Track listing

References

2012 albums
Now, Now albums